Catherine "Cat" Sandion (born 8 September 1985) is a British television presenter. She is of Mauritian heritage. She began presenting in 2008, starting a television career as a member of the cast of Hi-5, the British version of the Australian children's television programme also called Hi-5. Sandion began presenting CBeebies in January 2013.

From 2017-2018, Sandion presented a show on CBeebies called Magic Door. In 2016 she joined the cast of Justin's House for the fourth series.

References

External links

1985 births
Living people
BBC television presenters
British children's musicians
English people of Greek Cypriot descent